The involvement of New Zealand in the Korean War began in 1950 as a response to the United Nations Security Council's call for combat assistance in the erupting Korean War. New Zealand was one of the first (of a total of sixteen) nations to respond with support.

Naval forces

On 29 June 1950, just four days after 135,000 North Korean troops crossed the 38th parallel in Korea, the New Zealand government ordered two Loch class frigates of the Royal New Zealand Navy –  and  – to prepare to make for Korean waters, and for the whole of the war, at least two NZ vessels would be on station in the theater.

On 3 July, these two first ships left Devonport Naval Base, Auckland and joined other Commonwealth forces at Sasebo, Japan, on 2 August. These vessels served under the command of a British flag officer (seemingly Flag Officer, Second-in-Command, Far East Fleet) and formed part of the US Navy screening force during the Battle of Inchon, performing shore raids and inland bombardment. Only one RNZN sailor, Able Seaman R.E. Marchioni, was killed throughout the conflict; during a raid on Sogon-ni on 26 August 1951 with HMNZS Rotoiti.

Ground forces

After some debate, on 26 July 1950, the Government of New Zealand announced it would raise a volunteer military force to serve with UN forces in Korea. The idea was opposed initially by the Chief of the General Staff, Major General Keith Stewart, who did not believe the force would be large enough to be self-sufficient. His opposition was ignored and the government raised what was known as Kayforce, a total of 1,044 men selected from among volunteers. 16th Field Regiment, Royal New Zealand Artillery and support elements arrived later during the conflict from New Zealand. The force arrived at Pusan on New Year's Eve and on 21 January joined the British 27th Infantry Brigade. The New Zealanders immediately saw combat and spent the next two and a half years taking part in the operations (most notably the Battle of Kapyong and the First Battle of Maryang San) which led the United Nations forces back to and over the 38th Parallel (with the NZ naval vessels being especially active in the inner Han River estuary), later recapturing Seoul in the process.

Although overshadowed by 16 Field Regiment RNZA's contribution to the 1950–54 Korean War, New Zealand also contributed 10 Company, RNZASC as part of Kayforce. They totalled 408 personnel of all ranks and would serve with distinction in Korea from 1951 until 1956 as part of the 1st Commonwealth Division.

Following the armistice, RNZN deployments continued, together with Army support elements until 1957 as Kayforce was gradually reduced in size. The majority of Kayforce had returned to New Zealand by 1955, though it was not until 1957 that the last New Zealand soldiers left Korea. A single New Zealand military liaison officer on the Commonwealth Liaison Mission, Korea, remained in the country until 1971. A total of 3,794 New Zealand soldiers served in Kayforce and 1,300 in the RNZN deployment. Thirty-three were killed in action and many were eventually buried at the United Nations Memorial Cemetery in Busan, South Korea. Other casualties included 79 wounded and 1 taken prisoner. The prisoner, from Cambridge, Waikato, was held in North Korea for eighteen months and repatriated after the armistices. A New Zealander flying with the Royal Australian Air Force was also captured when he was shot down near P'yongyang, and was repatriated at around the same time.

Air forces
No Royal New Zealand Air Force units were sent to Korea, but a number of New Zealanders flew with other air forces in the conflict. Two men flew Gloster Meteor jets with No. 77 Squadron RAAF; one, Vance Drummond, was shot down and captured. A New Zealand Army artillery lieutenant was attached to a USAF tactical control unit as an observer in light aircraft. New Zealand born Alan Boxer, later a British air marshal, flew B-29 Superfortress missions on USAF attachment. One New Zealander flying in Korea as a lieutenant in the British Royal Navy from HMS Ocean, Cedric Macpherson, was killed on 11 February 1953 when his Hawker Sea Fury was shot down by ground fire. Five New Zealanders took part in Royal Australian Navy missions over Korea from the Australian carrier HMAS Sydney. Some of these pilots were former RNZAF members, others joining directly the British and Australian forces.

References

External links

 New Zealand in the Korean War – NZ History Online

United Nations contingents in Korea
Korean War
New Zealand
Military history of New Zealand